Ernesto Durón (born 12 September 1952) is a Salvadoran former swimmer. He competed in three events at the 1968 Summer Olympics.

References

1952 births
Living people
Salvadoran male swimmers
Olympic swimmers of El Salvador
Swimmers at the 1968 Summer Olympics
Sportspeople from San Salvador